This article lists the kings of Urartu (Ararat or Kingdom of Van), an Iron Age kingdom centered on Lake Van in eastern Asia Minor.

Early kings
Arame (also Aramu, Arama) 858 BC–844 BC
Lutipri 844 BC–834 BC (?)

Rise to power
Sarduri I (also Sarduris I, Sedur I, Asiduri I) 834 BC–828 BC; known in Assyrian sources as Ishtarduri, moved the capital to Tushpa, expanded the fortress of Van, possibly established new dynasty. 
Ishpuini (also Ishpuinis, Ispuini) the Establisher 828 BC–810 BC; expanded the empire and conquered Musasir.
Menua (also Menuas, Minua) the Conqueror 810 BC–785 BC; initially ruled jointly with his father Ishpuini and later jointly ruled with his son, Inushpua, greatly expanded the kingdom, organized the centralized administrative structure, fortified a number of cities and founded fortresses, developed a national canal and irrigation system.
Inushpua 788–786 BC (?); co-ruled with his father, Menua. Possibly killed in battle. 
Argishti I (also Argishtis I, Argishtish I, Argisti I) 785–763 BC; fortified the empire's frontier, founded Erebuni (modern-day Yerevan).
Sarduri II 763 BC–735 BC; maximum expansion; zenith of Urartian power.
Rusa I (also Rusas, Ursa) 735 BC–714 BC; Assyrian and Cimmerian attacks.
Melartua (714) briefly served as king after his father's defeat, subsequently killed by Urartian nobles
Argishti II 714–680 BC
Rusa II (known to Assyrian king as Yaya or Iaya) 680 BC–639 BC
Sarduri III 639 BC–635 BC

Decline
Erimena 635–629 BC (?)
Rusa III 629 BC–590 BC or 629 BC–615 BC

Defeat and destruction
Sarduri IV 615 BC–595 BC
Rusa IV 595 BC–585 BC; raids of Medes and Scythians. Assyrians King Tiglath-Pileser III destroyed castle of Rusa, which has been recently discovered under Lake Van, Turkey. Archaeologists also discovered jars that once contained wheat, oil and wine, in the ruins of a castle the Turks call "Chavez Tepe", built by Uzira Sardouri II (ruled: 764–735 BC). Each  buried jar with orifice covered with wedge engraved ceramic lids can hold 300 kg.

See also
List of Mesopotamian dynasties

References

Boris Piotrovskii, The Ancient Civilization of Urartu, London, 1969.
Igor Diakonoff, The Pre-History of the Armenian People, Caravan Books, New York, 1988.
M. Chahin, The Kingdom of Armenia, Curzon, London, 2001.

External links
 Urartu

 
Urartu